Henry Ritchie was a recipient of the Victoria Cross.

Henry Ritchie may also refer to:

 Harry Ritchie, journalist
 Harry Ritchie (footballer), Scottish footballer